The  was an electric multiple unit (EMU) train introduced experimentally from 2007 on commuter services on the Keiyo Line in Japan operated by East Japan Railway Company (JR East). Only one trainset was built, and it differed significantly from other JR commuter EMUs in having articulated cars with shared bogies and using direct-drive motors.

Bogies
The 14-car set was mounted on a total of 16 bogies: four TR257 trailer bogies (cars 1, 7, 8, 14), six TR258 shared trailer bogies, and six DT73 shared motor bogies.

Formation
The lone set, AK1, consisted of two 7-car half-sets, and is formed as follows, with car 1 at the Tokyo end.

 Cars 3 and 10 (SaHa E331-502 and SaHa E331-501) were each fitted with one PS37 single-arm pantograph.
 Cars 1 and 14 seated 36 when the seats are configured in transverse mode.

Interior
Cars 2 to 13 had longitudinal seating, while the end cars 1 and 14 had transverse seating bays which could be rotated and rearranged longitudinally against the train sides to provide increased standing space during peak hours.

History
Incorporating new technology tested on the earlier experimental E993 series "AC Train", the E331 series was delivered to JR East in March 2006. Cars 1 to 7 were built by Tokyu Car Corporation in Yokohama, and cars 8 to 14 were built by Kawasaki Heavy Industries in Kobe.

From April, the set was taken out of service, and in October 2007, the seven Kawasaki-built cars were returned to their manufacturer for modifications, and in March 2008, the seven Tokyu Car cars were also returned to Tokyu Car for modifications. The set was returned to service on 23 December 2008.

The set was removed from revenue service in May 2009, returning to service on 3 April 2010. It was subsequently removed from service again, and remained stored out of service at Shin-Narashino Depot from early 2011 before finally being hauled to Nagano Works in March 2014 for scrapping.

See also
 E231 series
 E233 series

References

Further reading

External links

  (JR East) 
 JR East E331 series (Japan Railfan Magazine Online) 

Electric multiple units of Japan
East Japan Railway Company
Train-related introductions in 2007
Articulated passenger trains
Experimental vehicles
Tokyu Car multiple units
Kawasaki multiple units
1500 V DC multiple units of Japan